Steidl is a surname. Notable people with the surname include:

Gabriele Steidl (born 1963), German mathematician
Gerhard Steidl, founder of the Steidl publishing company
Pavel Steidl (born 1961), Czech classical guitarist
Walter Steidl (born 1957), Austrian politician